Saint-Germain-Laval may refer to the following communes in France:

Saint-Germain-Laval, Loire, in the Loire  département
Saint-Germain-Laval, Seine-et-Marne, in the Seine-et-Marne  département